1995 Emperor's Cup Final was the 75th final of the Emperor's Cup competition. The final was played at National Stadium in Tokyo on January 1, 1996. Nagoya Grampus Eight won the championship.

Overview
Nagoya Grampus Eight won their 1st title, by defeating Sanfrecce Hiroshima 3–0  with Takafumi Ogura and Takashi Hirano goal.

Match details

See also
1995 Emperor's Cup

References

Emperor's Cup
1995 in Japanese football
Nagoya Grampus matches
Sanfrecce Hiroshima matches